DSSC may mean:

 Double-sideband suppressed carrier, radio technology
 Data Storage Systems Center at Carnegie Mellon University
 The Defense Services Staff College in Wellington, Tamil Nadu, India
 D.S. Senanayake College Colombo 7, Sri Lanka
 Dye-sensitized solar cell
 Data Structure for the Security Suitability of Cryptographic Algorithms RFC 5698